In business, total value added is calculated by tabulating the unit value added (measured by summing unit profit [the difference between sale price and production cost], unit depreciation cost, and unit labor cost) per each unit of product sold. Thus, total value added is equivalent to revenue minus intermediate consumption. Value added is a higher portion of revenue for integrated companies (e.g. manufacturing companies) and a lower portion of revenue for less integrated companies (e.g. retail companies); total value added is very closely approximated by compensation of employees, which represents a return to labor, plus earnings before taxes, representative of a return to capital.

In economics, specifically macroeconomics, the term value added refers to the contribution of the factors of production (i.e. capital and labor) to raise the value of the product and increase the income of those who own the said factors. Therefore, the national value added is shared between capital and labor.

Outside of business and economics, value added refers to the economic enhancement that a company gives its products or services prior to offering them to the consumer, which justifies why companies are able to sell products for more than they cost the company to produce. Additionally, this enhancement also helps distinguish the company's products from those of its competitors.

Definition
Value added is the market value of the aggregate output of a transformation process, minus the market value of the aggregate input(s) of a transformation process. One way of describing value added is with the help of Ulbo de Sitter's design theory for production synergies. He divides transformation processes into two categories, parts and aspects. Parts can be compared to stages, such as first preparing the dish, then washing it, then drying it. Aspects are equated with area specialization, for example that someone takes care of the part of the counter that consists of glass, another takes care of the part that consists of plates, a third takes care of cutlery. Thus, an important point of view for understanding value added is to understand its delimitations.

National accounts

The factors of production provide "services" which raise the unit price of a product (X) relative to the cost per unit of intermediate goods used up in the production of X.

In national accounts, such as the United Nations System of National Accounts (UNSNA) or the United States National Income and Product Accounts (NIPA), gross value added is obtained by deducting intermediate consumption from gross output. Thus gross value added is equal to net output. Net value added is obtained by deducting consumption of fixed capital (or depreciation charges) from gross value added. Net value added therefore equals gross wages, pre-tax profits net of depreciation, and indirect taxes less subsidies.

Differences between Marxist and neoclassical accounting of value added

A difference between Marxist theory and conventional national accounts concerns the interpretation of the distinction between new value created, transfers of value and conserved value, and of the definition of "production".

For example, Marxist theory regards the "imputed rental value of owner-occupied housing" which is included in GDP as a fictitious entry; if the housing is owner-occupied, this housing cannot also yield real income from its market-based rental value at the same time.

In the 1993 manual of the United Nations System of National Accounts (UNSNA), the concept of "imputed rental value of owner occupied housing" is explained as follows:

"6.89. Heads of household who own the dwellings which the households occupy are formally treated as owners of unincorporated enterprises that produce housing services consumed by those same households.  As well-organized markets for rented housing exist in most countries, the output of own-account housing services can be valued using the prices of the same kinds of services sold on the market in line with the general valuation rules adopted for goods or services produced on own account.  In other words, the output of the housing services produced by owner-occupiers is valued at the estimated rental that a tenant would pay for the same accommodation, taking into account factors such as location, neighborhood amenities, etc. as well as the size and quality of the dwelling itself.  The same figure is recorded under household final consumption expenditures."

Marxist economists object to this accounting procedure on the ground that the monetary imputation made refers to a flow of income which does not exist, because most home owners do not rent out their homes if they are living in them.

Another important difference concerns the treatment of property rents, land rents and real estate rents. In the Marxian interpretation, many of these rents, insofar as they are paid out of the sales of current output of production, constitute part of the new value created and part of the real cost structure of production. They should therefore be included in the valuation of the net product. This contrasts with the conventional national accounting procedure, where many property rents are excluded from new value-added and net product on the ground that they do not reflect a productive contribution.

Value added tax

Value-added tax (VAT) is a tax on sales. It is assessed incrementally on a product or service at each stage of production and is intended to tax the value that is added by that production stage, as outlined above by unit value added.

See also

Added value
Bang for the buck
Economic value added
Measures of national income and output#The output approach
No value added
Productive and unproductive labour
Surplus-value
United Nations System of National Accounts (UNSNA)
Valorisation
Value (marketing)
Value-added reseller
Value chain
Value product
Wage share

References

 Alan Deardorff Deardorff's Glossary of International Economics  (Click "V' for "Value added.")
Edgar Z. Palmer, The meaning and measurement of the national income, and of other social accounting aggregates.
Paul A. Samuelson and William D. Nordhaus (2004) Economics. "Glossary of Terms," Value added.
Anwar Shaikh & Ahmet Ertugrul Tonak, Measuring the Wealth of Nations. CUP.
M. Yanovsky, Anatomy of Social Accounting Systems.

External links
 What Does Value Add Mean?
 Value Add - Your Value Add is what Matters to Your Company
 http://www.isixsigma.com/dictionary/value-added/

Valuation (finance)
Marxian economics
National accounts